In theoretical particle physics, the gluon field strength tensor is a second order tensor field characterizing the gluon interaction between quarks.

The strong interaction is one of the fundamental interactions of nature, and the quantum field theory (QFT) to describe it is called quantum chromodynamics (QCD). Quarks interact with each other by the strong force due to their color charge, mediated by gluons. Gluons themselves possess color charge and can mutually interact.

The gluon field strength tensor is a rank 2 tensor field on the spacetime with values in the adjoint bundle of the chromodynamical SU(3) gauge group (see vector bundle for necessary definitions).

Convention
Throughout this article, Latin indices (typically ) take values 1, 2, ..., 8 for the eight gluon color charges, while Greek indices (typically ) take values 0 for timelike components and 1, 2, 3 for spacelike components of four-vectors and four-dimensional spacetime tensors. In all equations, the summation convention is used on all color and tensor indices, unless the text explicitly states that there is no sum to be taken (e.g. “no sum”).

Definition
Below the definitions (and most of the notation) follow K. Yagi, T. Hatsuda, Y. Miake and Greiner, Schäfer.

Tensor components

where:

in which

 is the imaginary unit; 
 is the coupling constant of the strong force; 
 are the Gell-Mann matrices  divided by 2; 
 is a color index in the adjoint representation of SU(3) which take values 1, 2, ..., 8 for the eight generators of the group, namely the Gell-Mann matrices; 
 is a spacetime index, 0 for timelike components and 1, 2, 3 for spacelike components; 
 expresses the gluon field, a spin-1 gauge field or, in differential-geometric parlance, a connection in the SU(3) principal bundle;
  are its four (coordinate-system dependent) components, that in a fixed gauge are  traceless Hermitian matrix-valued functions, while  are 32 real-valued functions, the four components for each of the eight four-vector fields.

Different authors choose different signs.

Expanding the commutator gives;

so that:

where again  are color indices. As with the gluon field, in a specific coordinate system and fixed gauge  are  traceless Hermitian matrix-valued functions, while  are real-valued functions, the components of eight four-dimensional second order tensor fields.

Differential forms

The gluon color field can be described using the language of differential forms, specifically as an adjoint bundle-valued curvature 2-form (note that fibers of the adjoint bundle are the su(3) Lie algebra);

The Cartan-derivative of the field form (i.e. essentially the divergence of the field) would be zero in the absence of the "gluon terms", i.e. those  which represent the non-abelian character of the SU(3).

A more mathematically formal derivation of these same ideas (but a slightly altered setting) can be found in the article on metric connections.

Comparison with the electromagnetic tensor

This almost parallels the electromagnetic field tensor (also denoted ) in quantum electrodynamics, given by the electromagnetic four-potential  describing a spin-1 photon;

or in the language of differential forms:

The key difference between quantum electrodynamics and quantum chromodynamics is that the gluon field strength has extra terms which lead to self-interactions between the gluons and asymptotic freedom. This is a complication of the strong force making it inherently non-linear, contrary to the linear theory of the electromagnetic force. QCD is a non-abelian gauge theory. The word non-abelian in group-theoretical language means that the group operation is not commutative, making the corresponding Lie algebra non-trivial.

QCD Lagrangian density

Characteristic of field theories, the dynamics of the field strength are summarized by a suitable Lagrangian density and substitution into the Euler–Lagrange equation (for fields) obtains the equation of motion for the field. The Lagrangian density for massless quarks, bound by gluons, is:

In the fermionic term , both color and spinor indices are suppressed.

Gauge transformations

In contrast to QED, the gluon field strength tensor is not gauge invariant by itself. Only the product of two contracted over all indices is gauge invariant.

Equations of motion

Treated as a classical field theory, the equations of motion for the quark fields are:

which is like the Dirac equation, and the equations of motion for the gluon (gauge) fields are:

which are similar to the Maxwell equations (when written in tensor notation). More specifically, these are the Yang–Mills equations for quark and gluon fields. The color charge four-current is the source of the gluon field strength tensor, analogous to the electromagnetic four-current as the source of the electromagnetic tensor. It is given by

which is a conserved current since color charge is conserved. In other words, the color four-current must satisfy the continuity equation:

See also
Quark confinement
Gell-Mann matrices
Field (physics)
Yang–Mills field
Eightfold Way (physics)
Einstein tensor
Wilson loop
Wess–Zumino gauge
Quantum chromodynamics binding energy
Ricci calculus
Special unitary group

References

Notes

Further reading

Books

Selected papers

External links

Gauge theories
Quantum chromodynamics
Gluons